The Pakistan cricket team are scheduled to tour Sri Lanka in July 2023 to play two Test matches against the Sri Lankan cricket team. The Test series will form part of the 2023–2025 ICC World Test Championship. The International Cricket Council in a press release confirmed that the bilateral series.

References

2023 in Sri Lankan cricket
2023 in Pakistani cricket
International cricket competitions in 2023
Pakistani cricket tours of Sri Lanka